Metharbital was patented in 1905 by Emil Fischer working for Merck. It was marketed as Gemonil by Abbott Laboratories. It is a barbiturate anticonvulsant, used in the treatment of epilepsy. It has similar properties to phenobarbital.

History 
 1952 Gemonil was introduced by Abbott Laboratories. 
 1990 Abbott stopped marketing.

Synthesis
Metharbital can be synthesized from 2,2-diethylmalonic acid and O-methylisourea.

References 

Anticonvulsants
Barbiturates
GABAA receptor positive allosteric modulators
AbbVie brands